SmartAsset financial technology company, founded in July 2012 by Michael Carvin and Phillip Camilleri and headquartered in New York, New York. The company publishes articles, guides, reviews, calculators and tools to help people make decisions about personal finance.

SmartAsset also operates SmartAdvisor, a digital platform that connects consumers with financial advisors.

History 
SmartAsset launched in July 2012 by CEO Michael Carvin and CTO Philip Camilleri as a Y Combinator startup company. The company's product offering initially revolved around home buying. It expanded to include tools, financial calculators and articles about personal finance topics, including taxes, retirement, banking and investing.

They have provided research studies featuring data analysis on topics like best cities for women in tech and most affordable places to live.

The company launched a platform called Captivate that enables financial publishers to host its tools on their own online content in 2015.

In 2018, SmartAsset launched SmartAdvisor, a lead generation platform that connects consumers with financial advisors.

Investment and finances 
SmartAsset raised more than $161 million across funding rounds, including $110 million in a 2021 Series D round. Investors include Y Combinator, Focus Financial Partners, Javelin Venture Partners, North Bridge Venture Partners, Denis Grosz, SV Angel, Brendan F. Wallace, Quotidian Ventures, IA Capital Group and others.

Awards 
The Webby Awards Runner-up 2013
The Webby Awards Honoree 2014

References

External links 

2012 establishments in New York (state)
Companies based in New York City
Financial technology companies
Technology companies established in 2012
Y Combinator companies